Psotnik is an elf, "mischief maker", in Polish mythology. It comes from the Polish word "psot", which means "mischief". Other translations of psotnik are "prankster," "jester," and "small soft-bodied insect with chewing mouthparts and either no wings or two pairs".

References 

Slavic legendary creatures